Charles Frédéric Girard (8 March 1822 – 29 January 1895) was a French biologist specializing in ichthyology and herpetology.

Born in Mulhouse, France, he studied at the College of Neuchâtel, Switzerland, as a student of Louis Agassiz. In 1847, he accompanied Agassiz as his assistant to Harvard University. Three years later, Spencer Fullerton Baird called him to the Smithsonian Institution to work on its growing collection of North American reptiles, amphibians and fishes. He worked at the museum for the next ten years and published numerous papers, many in collaboration with Baird.

In 1854, he was naturalized as a U.S. citizen. Besides his work at the Smithsonian, he managed to earn an M.D. from Georgetown University in Washington, D.C. in 1856. In 1859 he returned to France and was awarded the Cuvier Prize by the Institute of France for his work on the North American reptiles and fishes two years later.

When the American Civil War broke out, he joined the Confederates as an agent for surgical and medical supplies. After the war, he remained in France and started a medical career. During the Franco-Prussian War he served as a military physician and published an important paper on the typhoid fever after the siege of Paris. He remained active as a medical doctor until ca. 1888. In the following three years, he published a few more papers on natural history.

He retired in 1891 and spent the rest of his life in Neuilly-sur-Seine, where he died in 1895.


Eponymy
Girard is commemorated in the names of the following taxa:
Girardinus Poey, 1854
Girardinichthys Bleeker, 1860
Cambarus girardianus Faxon, 1884
Masticophis taeniatus girardi (Stejneger & Barbour, 1917)
Microcyphus girardi Desor
Synapta girardi Pourtalès
Vortex girardi O. Schmidt, 1857

See also
:Category:Taxa named by Charles Frédéric Girard

References

External links

1822 births
1895 deaths
French herpetologists
French ichthyologists
Harvard University staff
Georgetown University School of Medicine alumni
Scientists from Mulhouse
19th-century American zoologists
19th-century French zoologists
American herpetologists
American ichthyologists
French emigrants to the United States